Lamprologus finalimus is a little-known species of cichlid endemic to Lake Tanganyika where it is currently known only from its type locality - Uvira, Democratic Republic of the Congo - on the northern tip of the lake.

References

finalimus
Fish of the Democratic Republic of the Congo
Endemic fauna of the Democratic Republic of the Congo
Fish of Lake Tanganyika
Fish described in 1931
Taxonomy articles created by Polbot